Vice Admiral Scott Ray Van Buskirk, is a retired United States Navy officer who was the 56th Chief of Naval Personnel. He served as the CNP from October 2011 to August 2013. He was succeeded by Vice Admiral William F. Moran and retired after 34 years of service. He is one of only two submarine officers to have commanded a carrier strike group.

Biography

A native of Petaluma, California, Van Buskirk graduated from the United States Naval Academy in 1979.  He assumed duties as the Navy's 56th Chief of Naval Personnel on Oct. 11, 2011. His responsibilities include overseeing the United States Navy Recruiting Command, Navy Personnel Command, and Naval Education and Training Command.

Van Buskirk received a master's degree from the Naval Postgraduate School and served tours in the Navy Office of Legislative Affairs; Submarine Force U.S. Pacific Fleet; Bureau of Naval Personnel; and, Submarine Force U.S. Atlantic Fleet.

As a flag officer, he has served as commander, Task Force Total Force; deputy to the Deputy Chief of Staff, Strategic Effects (MNF-Iraq); commander, Carrier Strike Group Nine; assistant deputy, Chief of Naval Operations for Operations, Plans and Strategy (N3/N5B); deputy commander and chief of staff, U.S. Pacific Fleet.

Van Buskirk served as the 47th commander of the United States Seventh Fleet, forward deployed in Yokosuka, Japan, in 2010 and 2011.  He commanded U.S. naval forces during Operation Tomodachi, providing assistance to Japan following the 2011 Tōhoku earthquake and tsunami.

Awards and decorations

References

Living people
Recipients of the Navy Distinguished Service Medal
Recipients of the Legion of Merit
United States Naval Academy alumni
United States Navy admirals
1959 births